Alois Schätzle (30 August 1925 – 9 July 2022) was a German politician. A member of the Christian Democratic Union of Germany, he served in the Landtag of Baden-Württemberg from 1971 to 1988.

Schätzle died in Waldkirch on 9 July 2022 at the age of 96.

References

1925 births
2022 deaths
Christian Democratic Union of Germany politicians
20th-century German politicians
Members of the Landtag of Baden-Württemberg
Commanders Crosses of the Order of Merit of the Federal Republic of Germany
Knights of the Order of St. Sylvester
People from Emmendingen (district)